This article is about the particular significance of the year 1809 to Wales and its people.

Incumbents
Lord Lieutenant of Anglesey – Henry Paget 
Lord Lieutenant of Brecknockshire and Monmouthshire – Henry Somerset, 6th Duke of Beaufort
Lord Lieutenant of Caernarvonshire – Thomas Bulkeley, 7th Viscount Bulkeley
Lord Lieutenant of Cardiganshire – Thomas Johnes
Lord Lieutenant of Carmarthenshire – George Rice, 3rd Baron Dynevor 
Lord Lieutenant of Denbighshire – Sir Watkin Williams-Wynn, 5th Baronet    
Lord Lieutenant of Flintshire – Robert Grosvenor, 1st Marquess of Westminster 
Lord Lieutenant of Glamorgan – John Stuart, 1st Marquess of Bute 
Lord Lieutenant of Merionethshire - Sir Watkin Williams-Wynn, 5th Baronet
Lord Lieutenant of Montgomeryshire – Edward Clive, 1st Earl of Powis
Lord Lieutenant of Pembrokeshire – Richard Philipps, 1st Baron Milford
Lord Lieutenant of Radnorshire – George Rodney, 3rd Baron Rodney

Bishop of Bangor – John Randolph (until 9 August); Henry Majendie (from 5 October)
Bishop of Llandaff – Richard Watson
Bishop of St Asaph – William Cleaver 
Bishop of St Davids – Thomas Burgess

Events
9 February - South Stack Lighthouse off Anglesey first illuminated.
10 May - Stapleton Cotton plays a prominent role in the Battle of Grijó.
date unknown
David Hughes, Principal of Jesus College, Oxford, donates £105 towards scholarships to give South Wales the same level of support as North Wales.
Hawarden Castle is enlarged.
Restoration of Brecon Castle as a hotel begins.
John Rice Jones begins lead mining across the Mississippi in the future state of Missouri.
Jeremiah Homfray opens a level at Richard Griffiths' lease in Trehafod in the Rhondda; the first full scale attempt to mine coal in the area.

Arts and literature

New books
Edward Davies - The Mythology and Rites of the British Druids
Zaccheus Davies - Cân am y Farn
Thomas Evans (Tomos Glyn Cothi) - An English-Welsh Dictionary neu Eir-Lyfr Saesneg a Chymraeg
Theophilus Jones - History of the County of Brecknock, vol. 2
Henry Parry (editor) Grammatica Britannica, 2nd edition (1st edition by John Davies of Mallwyd)

Music
George Thomson - A Selected Collection of Original Welsh Airs (1st edition)

Births
18 January - John Gwyn Jeffreys, conchologist (died 1885)
15 February - Owen Jones, architect (died 1874)
17 April - Thomas Brigstocke, painter  (died 1881)
24 May - William Chambers, politician (died 1882)
26 May - G. T. Clark, engineer (died 1885)
11 August - Robert Thomas (Ap Vychan), writer (died 1880)
20 August - Morris Williams (Nicander), writer (died 1874)
27 October - Lewis Edwards, Nonconformist minister and educator (died 1887)
22 December - John Hanmer, 1st Baron Hanmer, politician (died 1882)
18 January - Evan James, weaver and mill-owner, lyricist of the Welsh national anthem (died 1878)

Deaths
23 January - Hugh Barlow, politician, 79/80
10 February - Hugh Bold, lawyer, 77/78
April - Charles Francis Greville, founder of Milford Haven, 59
October 28 - Hugh Pugh, Independent minister, 29

References

 
 Wales